Sir Israel Hart (16 February 1835 – 24 March 1911) was a British merchant and Liberal Party politician.

Background
In 1875, he married Charlotte Victoria Moses of Bayswater, London. They had one daughter, Vera Charlotte Hart, who married the son of Emanuel Raphael Belilios and three sons; Edward Samuel, Arthur Charles and Leycester Israel George who died in infancy. Hart was knighted in 1895.

Professional career
He was Chairman of Hart & Levy, wholesale merchants and garment manufacturers of Leicester.

Political career
Hart first became active in municipal politics, being elected to Leicester Town Council. On 29 October 1878 he presented to the council "a handsome ornamental fountain to be placed in the centre of the land fronting the Town Hall Buildings"  for the purpose of keeping open a public square for all time. In 1885 he was appointed High Bailiff of the borough of Leicester. He served as a councillor for 25 years and was Mayor of Leicester from 1884-6 and 1893-94. He also presented a free library to the town.

He was Liberal candidate for the Hythe division of Kent at the 1895 General Election. He was Liberal candidate for the Hythe division at the 1899 Hythe by-election. He was Liberal candidate for the Hackney Central division of London at the 1900 General Election. He did not stand for parliament again.

Electoral record

Arms

References

1835 births
1911 deaths
Liberal Party (UK) parliamentary candidates
Knights Bachelor